Peter Emil Julius Blum (4 May 1925 – 5 December 1990) was an Afrikaans poet. As a child, he emigrated to the Union of South Africa with his family. From an early age Blum was already able to speak several languages, including German and Italian.

After studying literature at the University of Cape Town and at the University of Stellenbosch, he took up a position as a librarian in Cape Town and, later, in Kroonstad in the Orange Free State. Blum married Henrietta Cecilia Smit (born 3 November 1911, died 2002 in Worthing, Sussex, UK), a South African art teacher, in 1955.

His success as a poet was first affirmed in 1956 when he won the Reina Prinsen Geerligs Prize for his volume Steenbok tot poolsee (the title being a reference to the Tropic of Capricorn and the southern Antarctic Ocean, relating to the geographical location of South and Southern Africa).

Blum was twice denied South African citizenship. Kannemeyer (1993) speculates that citizenship was denied because of Blum's vociferous opposition to the ruling National Party's policy of apartheid.

Frustrated by this turn of events, Blum and his wife left South Africa to resettle in the suburb of Hounslow in London.

During his imprisonment between 1975 and 1982, Breyten Breytenbach wrote the poem, Ballade van ontroue bemindes("Ballade of Unfaithful Lovers"). Inspired by François Villon's Ballade des Dames du Temps Jadis, Breytenbach compared Afrikaner dissidents Peter Blum, Ingrid Jonker, and himself to unfaithful lovers, who had betrayed Afrikaans poetry by taking leave of it.

Peter Blum died in London on 5 December 1990, aged 65.

Works

 Steenbok tot poolsee (1955) Tafelberg: Cape Town. 
 Enklaves van die lig (1958) Human & Rousseau: Cape Town.

References

Works about Peter Blum

 Kannemeyer, J.C. (1993) Wat het geword van Peter Blum? Tafelberg: Cape Town. 
 Kannemeyer, J.C. (2009) Briewe van Peter Blum Hemel en see Uitgewers: Hermanus. 
 Kannemeyer, J.C. (1983) Geskiedenis van die Afrikaanse Literatuur Band 2 H&R-Academica: Pretoria

External links

 Biography on publisher's web site
 Stellenbosch Writers

1925 births
1990 deaths
Afrikaans-language poets
Italian male poets
Italian emigrants to South Africa
Italian emigrants to the United Kingdom
20th-century Italian poets
20th-century Italian male writers
People from Trieste